Events from the year 1755 in Wales.

Incumbents
Lord Lieutenant of North Wales (Lord Lieutenant of Anglesey, Caernarvonshire, Flintshire, Merionethshire, Montgomeryshire) – George Cholmondeley, 3rd Earl of Cholmondeley 
Lord Lieutenant of Glamorgan – Other Windsor, 4th Earl of Plymouth
Lord Lieutenant of Brecknockshire and Lord Lieutenant of Monmouthshire – Thomas Morgan
Lord Lieutenant of Cardiganshire – Wilmot Vaughan, 3rd Viscount Lisburne
Lord Lieutenant of Carmarthenshire – George Rice
Lord Lieutenant of Denbighshire – Richard Myddelton
Lord Lieutenant of Pembrokeshire – Sir William Owen, 4th Baronet
Lord Lieutenant of Radnorshire – William Perry

Bishop of Bangor – Zachary Pearce 
Bishop of Llandaff – Edward Cresset (until 13 February); Richard Newcome (from 13 April)
Bishop of St Asaph – Robert Hay Drummond
Bishop of St Davids – Anthony Ellys

Events
Following the death of his wife in this year, Griffith Jones (Llanddowror) goes to live at the home of Madam Bridget Bevan.
The Brecknockshire Agricultural Society is formed.

Arts and literature

New books
Rules of the Honourable Society of Cymmrodorion are published.

Music
Morgan Rhys - Golwg o Ben Nebo, ar Wlad yr Addewid (collection of hymns)

Births

22 February - Henry Nevill, 2nd Earl of Abergavenny (died 1843)
9 May - Wilmot Vaughan, 2nd Earl of Lisburne, owner of the Trawsgoed estate (died 1820)
5 July - Sarah Siddons, actress (d. 1831)
14 October - Thomas Charles of Bala, clergyman (died 1814)
21 October - Caleb Hillier Parry, Welsh-descended physician (died 1822)
18 November - Rev. William Jones (died 1821)

Deaths
13 February - Edward Cresset, Bishop of Llandaff, 57
30 June - Edward Wynne, lawyer and landowner
12 July - Zachariah Williams, inventor, 81
date unknown - John Owen, chancellor of Bangor

References

1755 by country
1755 in Great Britain